CHWY-FM is a radio station in Weyburn, Saskatchewan. Broadcasting on 106.7 FM, the station is owned by Golden West Broadcasting, which received approval from the CRTC on February 17, 2012. It shares studios with Golden West's other Weyburn stations at 305 Souris Avenue in downtown Weyburn.

The station began test broadcasts in November 2013, and officially launched on December 10 of the same year with a mainstream rock format branded as K106.

On October 17, 2018, CHWY flipped to an adult hits format as Big 106.

References

External links

HWY
HWY
HWY
Weyburn
Radio stations established in 2013
2013 establishments in Saskatchewan